Dhubri Medical College and Hospital is a medical college with attached hospital located in Dhubri, Assam. This is the 9th medical college of the state.
The college operates under the State Ministry of Health and Family Welfare, Assam. It is recognised by National Medical Commission and affiliated with Srimanta Sankaradeva University of Health Sciences,  Guwahati. Currently the college has an intact capacity of 100 undergraduate students, from academic year 2022-23.

The college offers an undergraduate course in medicine (MBBS) with an annual intake capacity of 100 students. The college also offers postgraduate courses in various specializations, including Anatomy, Physiology, Biochemistry, Pharmacology, Microbiology, Pathology, Forensic Medicine, Community Medicine, General Medicine, Pediatrics, Anesthesiology, Radiology, and Obstetrics and Gynecology.

References 

Affiliates of Srimanta Sankaradeva University of Health Sciences
Medical colleges in Assam
Hospitals in Assam
Educational institutions established in 2022
2022 establishments in Assam